Liga Artzit (. Artzit) is the third tier level league of basketball competition in Israel. It is the league level that is below the second tier level Liga Leumit.

Until the 1991-92 season it was the second tier level league of basketball competition in Israel.

League system
The league contains 12 clubs (in two districts), which compete in a home-and-away round-robin. At the end of the season, the first team from each district (South/North) is promoted to the Liga Leumit.

The two teams that finish at the bottom of the table are relegated to the fourth tier, Liga Alef.

Current teams

League champions

External links
Eurobasket page

3
Isr
Professional sports leagues in Israel